Thibaud Turlan (born 18 October 1996) is a French rower. He competed in the 2020 Summer Olympics with his twin brother Guillaume.

References

1996 births
Living people
French male rowers
Olympic rowers of France
Rowers at the 2020 Summer Olympics
Sportspeople from Bordeaux